The Battle of Château-Thierry was fought on July 18, 1918 and was one of the first actions of the American Expeditionary Forces (AEF) under General John J. Pershing. It was a battle in World War I as part of the Second Battle of the Marne, initially prompted by a German Spring Offensive. German and local actions at Château-Thierry recommenced on May 31 to July 22, 1918, against the AEF, an American Expeditionary Force, consisting of troops from both the United States Army and Marine Corps units. These units were the newest troops on the front in France and just barely out of training.

The AEF counter-offensive combat action at Château-Thierry was relatively brief starting on July 18, 1918 and lasting for less than a week and was part of the allied effort to push back the recent German advance. American forces had linked up with their French allies at the Marne River on June 3, 1918 and had forced the Germans back across the river. This set the stage for the action at Château-Thierry and at the Battle of Belleau Wood. However, the later action raged for another three weeks.

Background 
Despite the revolution in Russia, fortune seemed to favor the Allies with the arrival of the Americans in France.  However, these troops needed time to train before they could be combat effective.  Recognizing the window of opportunity, General Ludendorff consolidated the manpower freed up from the Eastern Front to conduct Operation Michael in order to split the Allies' lines.  The successes of the German stormtrooper infiltration tactics earned Germany approximately 40 miles of territory. But the offensive lost momentum when it surpassed its supply lines.

From the arrival of the first American troops in France, General John Pershing, commander of the American Expeditionary Force, had refused to hand over his divisions to either British or French commanders, insisting on keeping them together as one army. Regular Army Buffalo Soldiers, African American ("colored") troops led by mainly white officers, of the four regiments of the 92nd and the 93rd infantry divisions, fought only under French command for the duration of the war, although experienced Black non-commissioned officers(NCOs) were often provided to other segregated volunteer units under American command – such as the 317th Engineer Battalion. 

Although he was determined to keep American troops under American command, in the face of the success of the German onslaught, Pershing relented and sent a portion of his army to assist the French in blocking the German advance in May 1918.

Prelude 
Looking to defeat the British occupied in Flanders, Ludendorff sought to divert the Allies' French reserves away from the region.  In his Operation Blucher, Ludendorff aimed some of his forces at the Chemin des Dames and took the French Sixth Army by surprise.  Driving on, the Germans were soon at the Marne River, situated under 50 miles from Paris. With Marshal Ferdinand Foch unable to acquire British assistance, General Pershing's chief of operation, Colonel Fox Conner, recognized the gravity of the situation and ordered the 3rd Division to block them.

The 3rd Division occupied the main bridge on the south bank of the Marne River that led in Château-Thierry on 31 May 1918 as the French 10th Colonial Division rendezvoused with them from the north bank. The Americans positioned their machine guns to cover the French retreat, and had a unit led by Lt. John Bissell situated north of the second bridge. The French spent the night adding explosives to the bridges to destroy them. Early the following morning, 1 June, the Germans advanced into Château-Thierry from the north, forcing the French to the main bridge, which they defended with the support of American machine-gun fire. The French succeeded in destroying the bridge as the Americans kept up their fire on the Germans.
Lt. Bissell's group was still on the north side of the Marne. They worked their way back to the secondary bridge in-between American machine-gun fire and made it across, along with a group of Germans that were captured shortly afterwards.
From the north of the Marne on 2 June, the Germans engaged in heavy artillery and sniper fire against the Allies. They made an attempt to take the remaining bridge but were forced to end the assault as the casualties rose.

Counter-Offensive action
The American army played a role fighting for the regions around Soissons and Château-Thierry, in collaboration with predominantly French forces. The Allies had managed to keep their plans a secret, and their attack at 04:45 took the Germans by surprise. The troops went "Over the Top" without a preparatory artillery bombardment, but instead followed closely behind a synchronized rolling barrage. Eventually, the assaults penetrated German lines and individual American units exercised initiative and continued fighting despite being nominally behind enemy lines.

Memorials

After World War I, a memorial was built on Hill 204, 2 miles (3 km.) west of the town for which it is named. The Château-Thierry Monument, designed by Paul P. Cret of Philadelphia, was constructed by the American Battle Monuments Commission "to commemorate the sacrifices and achievements of American and French fighting men in the region, and the friendship and cooperation of French and American forces during World War I."

There is also a monument in front of the Bronx County Courthouse in New York City that was presented by the American Legion on 11 November 1940. The monument consists of the "Keystone from an arch of the old bridge at Château-Thierry," which the monument notes was "Gloriously and successfully defended by American troops."

The first Filipino to die in World War I was Private Tomas Mateo Claudio who served with the U.S. Army as part of the American Expeditionary Forces to Europe. He died in the Battle of Chateau Thierry in France on 29 June 1918.  The Tomas Claudio Memorial College in Morong Rizal, Philippines, which was founded in 1950, was named in his honor.

In Literature
Walter Charles Robert's 1937 play Red Harvest is set at American Red Cross Hospital 111, a field hospital in Jouy-sur-Morin,  during the Battle of Château-Thierry. Based on the diary of an American Red Cross nurse at the battle, the hospital staff experiences air raids and shell fire while attempting to the save the lives of wounded soldiers, many of them difficult surgical cases.

A chapter in Ken Follett's 2010 historical novel Fall of Giants is devoted to The Battle of Château-Thierry, depicted alternately from the point of view of a German character and an American one. Follett's account emphasizes the fact that the Americans were freshly arrived and for most of them this was the first experience of combat - yet they stood well the "baptism of fire" and were able to confront the far more experienced German troops.

References

Further reading
 Allen, Hervey. Toward the Flame: A War Diary. Pittsburgh: University of Pittsburgh Press, 1968. 
 Asprey, Robert B.  At Belleau Wood. New York, Putnam [1965] 
 Bonk, David and Dennis, Peter. Château Thierry & Belleau Wood 1918 : America's Baptism of Fire on the Marne.  New York, NY, USA : Osprey Pub., 2007  
 Bresnahan, Thomas E. Chateau Thierry. [Holyoke, Mass.? s.n., 1918?]  
 Catlin, Albertus W and Dyer, Walter A. "With the Help of God and a Few Marines": The Battles of Chateau Thierry and Belleau Wood. Yardley : Westholme, [2013]     
 Cochrane, Rexmond C and United States Army Chemical Corps Historical Office Gas Warfare at Chateau Thierry, June 1918. [Army Chemical Center, Md.?] : [publisher not identified], [1956] 
 Daniels, Josephus; William, Crown Prince of Germany; Pershing, John J and Horne Charles F. Château-Thierry and Belleau Wood: How America held back the Germans at the Marne, May 31st-July 1st.  [S.l. : s.n., 1923?] 
 Gordon, George Vincent. Leathernecks and Doughboys. 1927. 
 Haylock H E. A History of Chateau Thierry. Paris : Printed by H. Clarke, 1926. 
 Hogan, Martin J and Cooke, James J.  The Shamrock Battalion in the Great War. Columbia : University of Missouri Press, 2007.  
 Homsher, David C. American Battlefields of World War 1, Château-Thierry—Then and Now : A Guidebook, Anthology, and Photographic Essay. San Mateo, Calif. : Battleground Productions, ©2006.    
 Kahn, Otto H. When the Tide Turned: The American Attack at Chateau Thierry and Belleau Wood in the first week of June, 1918. [Boston, Mass.?: s.n., 1918?].  
 Le Goffic, Charles and Menzies, Lucy. General Foch at the Marne: An Account of the Fighting in and near the Marshes of Saint-Gond. New York, E.P. Dutton and Company [1918].  
 Liggett, Hunter. Commanding an American Army: Recollections of the World War. Boston ; New York : Houghton Mifflin, 1925.  
 March, Francis Andrew, and Richard Joseph Beamish. History of the World War: An Authentic Narrative of the World's Greatest War. Chicago: John C. Winston Company, 1928. 
 Mitchell, William.  Memoirs of World War I: "From Start to Finish of our Greatest War". New York, Random House [1960].  
 Neiberg, Michael Scott. The Second Battle of the Marne. Bloomington : Indiana University Press, cop. 2008.   
 Ralphson, G Harvey.  Over There with the Marines at Chateau Thierry. Chicago : M.A. Donohue & Co., 1919 
 Sanford, William R; Green Carl R; Martin, George; Eggenschwiler, Jean and Nelson, Kate. The World War I Soldier at Château Thierry. Mankato, MN, U.S.A. : Capstone Press, 1991.  
 Terry, Charles. Wilson's War: America in the First World War. [S.l: s.n.], 2011.  
 Thomason, John W and Clark, George B. The United States Army Second Division Northwest of Chateau Thierry in World War I. Jefferson, N.C. : McFarland, 2006.  
 Van Every, Dale. The A.E.F. in Battle. New York, D. Appleton, 1928. 
 White, Meade Fitzhugh. The Miracle of Château-Thierry. Santa Monica, CA : M.F. White, [1971]. 
 Wise, Jennings C. The Turn of the Tide: American Operations at Cantigny, Château Thierry, and the Second Battle of the Marne. New York : H. Holt, 1920.

External links
 
  
  The Battles of the Marne 1918
 Château Thierry-June 1918
 WW1 :Pvt Frank Gdak from Poland Expeditionary Force website
 Battles – The Battle of Belleau Wood, 1918
 Battle of Château Thierry, 1–4 June 1918
 A Description of the Battle of Chateau-Thierry
 World War I monument photos including Chateau-Thierry's Hill 204 American Monument
 Battle of Chateau-Thierry at the American Expeditionary Force website
 Chateau-Thierry: The Battle For Belleau Wood
 World War 1 Chateau Thierry 1917 – YouTube

Conflicts in 1918
1918 in France
Battles of the Western Front (World War I)
Battles of World War I involving the United States
Battles of World War I involving Germany
Battles of World War I involving France
Battles of World War I involving Belgium
United States Marine Corps in World War I
July 1918 events